The Continental Hotel is a hotel in Budapest, Hungary.  The hotel is located on the corner of Nyár and Dohány streets, near the old Jewish quarter and the Klauzál Square market.

History 

The history of Continental Hotel dates to the early 20th century, when the first baths were built on site in 1827, then washed away in the Great Flood of 1838, but the building which still remains standing dates back to 1910.  The current premises of the hotel used to be home of the former Hungaria Bath, one of the most important spas of Pest and later to those of Budapest, and to the contemporary Continental Hotel which was opened in the Nyár utca wing.  In 1970, Continental Hotel closed its doors and during the 1980s the building which served as a hotel and spa for many years in the past, became in a perilous state.  Then after many years of negotiations and controversies of demolishing the building, in the summer of 2004, the National Office of Cultural Heritage ordered the interim protection of buildings at risk in the area of the former Pest Jewish ghetto, including the Hungária Bath. On February 7, 2005 the remaining section of the spa was declared a listed building. Finally, on April 7, 2009, after years of neglect, ZeinaHotel Ltd promoted a 50 million Euro construction project to revive the accommodation.

Location 
Continental Hotel is located in the heart of Budapest, near the junction of Nagykörút (Grand Boulevard) and Rákóczi út.

References 
 
 New hotel for BudapestTagungsWirtshaft Online November 3, 2009.
 Work on new 4-star hotel moves aheadBudapest Times October 26, 2009 - November 1, 2009.
HUNGARY: Continental Hotel Zara Opening June 2010I&Mi October 2009.

External links 
 Continental Hotel Budapest Website

Hotels in Budapest